Coral Casado Ortiz (born 27 March 1996) is a Spanish professional racing cyclist. She rode for team Bizkaia–Durango in 2015-2016.

See also
 List of 2015 UCI Women's Teams and riders

References

External links
 

1996 births
Living people
Spanish female cyclists
People from Palencia
Sportspeople from the Province of Palencia
Cyclists from Castile and León